Mabel Priscilla Penery French  (4 June 1881 – 13 January 1955) was the first woman to earn a law degree in New Brunswick and British Columbia.

She was born in Portland Parish, New Brunswick, the daughter of Henry Steeves French, a city constable; and Ruth Penery.

She graduated from King's College Law School, (then located in Saint John, New Brunswick), with a Bachelor of Civil Law degree in 1905, becoming the first woman in New Brunswick to receive that degree. When she sought entrance to the New Brunswick bar, she was refused, as legally she was not a person and therefore, not entitled to practise law. William Henry Tuck was most opposed. To protest this decision, she stopped paying her bills. Upon being sued for debt, her defence was that since she was not a person, she could not be sued, nor did she have to pay. Her defence failed, although she was ruled as a person.

In 1907, due to pressure from women, the Provincial Legislature passed "An Act to Remove the Disability of Women so far as Relates to the Study and Practice of the Law", and she was admitted to the New Brunswick bar. 

She practised law in Saint John as partner in the firm Bustin & French, often arguing in her cases that as women were not persons under the law, they could not be convicted under that law.  

She moved to Vancouver, British Columbia in 1910. The Law Society of British Columbia at that time excluded women, but she won the right to enter after applying to the Supreme Court of British Columbia for a writ of mandamus, in 1912 to compel the society to accept her application. When it was refused, she appealed.  Although Chief Justice James Alexander MacDonald was sympathetic, he ruled that British Columbia should follow the custom of England, which at the time did not allow women to practise. 

A similarly named act was passed by the Conservative government a short time later, just before the 1912 election.

After the act was passed, she left the firm Russell, Russell & Hannington and set up a single practice in Vancouver in 1913. The next year, she left Canada and moved to England, along with one of the partners in her former firm.

In 1923, she married Hugh Travis Clay, a worsted manufacturer. They moved to live in St. Helier, Jersey. She died there on 13 January 1955, at home.

See also
 Frances Fish - first woman to be called to the bar of Nova Scotia

References

Notes

External links 
 Mabel French at UNB Archives & Special Collections, 2014
 
 Mary Jane Mossman, "Invisible" Constraints on Lawyering and Leadership: The Case of Women Lawyers, 1988 20-2 Ottawa Law Review 567, 1988 CanLIIDocs 10, <https://canlii.ca/t/2b17>, retrieved on 2021-03-29
 
 
 
 
  widely reported, also as,  and  
 

1881 births
1955 deaths
Canadian women lawyers
Lawyers in New Brunswick
Lawyers in British Columbia
People from Saint John County, New Brunswick